Ravin Wickramaratne (born 9 April 1962) is a Sri Lankan former cricketer. He played in one List A and nineteen first-class matches from 1989 to 1993. After his playing career, he became the Vice-President of Sri Lanka Cricket, and the tournament director of the Lanka Premier League.

References

External links
 

1962 births
Living people
Sri Lankan cricketers
Panadura Sports Club cricketers
Place of birth missing (living people)